Jean-Claude Passeron (born 26 November 1930) is a French sociologist and leader of social science studies. As part of a mixed interdisciplinary team involving sociologists, historians, and anthropologists, he led the magazine Enquêtes.

Biography
In Paris, Jean-Claude Passeron studied philosophy and sociology at École Normale Supérieure. During the 1960s, he and Pierre Bourdieu did two studies of the sociology of education. With Jean-Claude Chamboredon and Bourdieu, he published Le Métier de sociologue, a reference work and epistemology work of the social sciences on cultural reproduction.

He led the sociology department at l'Université de Nantes, going often to Paris to lead studies. In 1968, he was part of the group which founded le Centre Universitaire Expérimental de Vincennes, an avant-garde pedagogic project that today has become l'Université Paris VIII.

He also worked with Jean-Claude Chamboredon, Robert Castel, Claude Grignon, Michel Grumbach and François de Singly. He studied the sociology of culture and the sociology of the arts. In 1991, he published Le Raisonnement sociologique, a book which had an impact on epistemology of the social sciences.

Publications
 with Pierre Bourdieu and Michel Eliard, Les Étudiants et leurs études, Paris, La Haye, Mouton, « Cahiers du centre de sociologie Européenne. sociologie de l'éducation », 1, 1964.
 with Pierre Bourdieu, Les Héritiers. Les étudiants et la culture, Paris, Les Éditions de Minuit, 1964.
 with Gérald Antoine, La Réforme de l'Université. Conservatisme et novation à l'Université, avant-propos de Raymond Aron, Paris, Calmann-Lévy, 1966.
 with Robert Castel, Éducation, développement et démocratie. Algérie, Espagne, France, Grèce, Hongrie, Italie, Pays arabes, Yougoslavie, études présentées par Robert Castel, Jean-Claude Passeron, Paris - La Haye, Mouton, « Cahiers du Centre de sociologie européenne », 4, 1967.
 with Pierre Bourdieu et Jean-Claude Chamboredon, Le Métier de sociologue, préalables épistémologiques, Paris, Mouton - Bordas, 1968.
 with Claude Grignon, Expériences françaises avant 1968, Études de cas sur l'innovation dans l'enseignement supérieur, Paris, OCDE, 1970.
 translation with Françoise et Jean-Claude Garcias and presentation by Richard Hoggart, La Culture du pauvre. Étude sur le style de vie des classes populaires en Angleterre (The Uses of literacy), Paris, Éditions de Minuit, « Le sens commun », 1970.
 with Pierre Bourdieu, La Reproduction. Éléments pour une théorie du système d'enseignement, Paris, Éditions de Minuit, « Le sens commun », 1970.
 presentation of Joseph Schumpeter, Impérialisme et classes sociales, traduction de Suzanne de Segonzac et Pierre Bresson, revue et présentée par Jean-Claude Passeron, Paris, Éditions de Minuit, « Le sens commun », 1972
 Les Mots de la sociologie, Nantes, Université de Nantes, 1980.
 with Michel Grumbach, L'Œil à la page : enquête sur les images et les bibliothèques, Paris, Bibliothèque Publique d’Information, 1985.
 with Claude Grignon, Le Savant et le populaire, misérabilisme et populisme en sociologie et en littérature, Paris, Seuil - Gallimard, 1989.
 with E. Pedler, Le Temps donné aux tableaux, Marseille, IMEREC, 1991.

References

1930 births
Living people
French sociologists
École Normale Supérieure alumni
French male writers
Academic staff of Paris 8 University Vincennes-Saint-Denis